Elizabeth Jones may refer to:

Elizabeth Jones
Elizabeth Jones (engraver) (born 1935), Chief Engraver of the United States Mint
Elizabeth Jones (silversmith), English silversmith
Elizabeth Jones, convicted in the Cleft chin murder case
Elizabeth Ames Jones (born 1956), one of the three elected members of the Texas Railroad Commission
A. Elizabeth Jones (born 1948), U.S. Ambassador to Kazakhstan
Elizabeth Jones (Mormonism)
Elizabeth Bolden (1890–2006), née Jones
Elizabeth Orton Jones (1910–2005), American illustrator
Elizabeth W. Jones (1939–2008), American geneticist
Elizabeth Jones (tennis) (born 1964), British tennis player

Liz Jones
Liz Jones (born 1958), English journalist and writer
Liz Jones (theatre director) (born 1946), Australian theatre director

Bessie Jones
Bessie Jones (American singer) (1902–1984), American singer
Bessie Jones (Welsh singer) (1887–1974), Welsh singer

Betsy Jones
Betsy Jones-Moreland (1930–2006), American actress